The Napindan Lighthouse (Filipino: Parola ng Napindan) was a lighthouse in Taguig, Rizal (present day Metro Manila). It served as a meeting point for the Katipunan, a revolutionary group that led the Philippine Independence movement. It was destroyed during the Philippine–American War.

Background
The Napindan Lighthouse (Parola ng Napindan) is a named used by historians to refer to a former lighthouse situated at the mouth of Napindan Channel, a vantage point of the Pasig River and Laguna de Bay. The site of the former lighthouse is in present-day Barangay Napindan in Taguig. There is no known extant photograph of the lighthouse.

Philippine Revolution
According to local historians of both the cities of Taguig and Pasig, the lighthouse was the first site where Katipunan leaders Andres Bonifacio and Emilio Aguinaldo met with fellow revolutionaries on the night of May 29, 1896 to launch an armed revolution against the Spanish colonial administration over the Philippines. The Cry of Pugad Lawin which occurred in August 1896 is widely regarded as the start of the Philippine Revolution.

At the lighthouse, Katipunan members were briefed by Pio Valenzuela regarding his dialogue with reformist writer José Rizal over the later's opinion on a revolution. Valenzuela reported that in order for a revolution to be a success they must maintain relations with wealthy traders, mobilize sympathizers to join the revolution, secure foreign government support, and enlist the service of Antonio Luna who is a military commander with training in peninsular Spain. It was during their meeting at the lighthouse, where the Katipunan decided to launch a revolution and planned to start the uprising following an onslaught of a typhoon. The revolution was started earlier than planned with the discovery of the Katipunan by Spanish colonial authorities.

Philippine-American War and destruction
During the Philippine–American War, the Katipunan used the site again as a command center. During the Battle of Taguig, the lighthouse was destroyed on March 19, 1899 by an American ship, the USS Laguna de Bay.

Replacement

A small concrete structure with a solar-power beacon was built by the Philippine Coast Guard to aid marine vessels entering the Pasig River from Laguna de Bay and vice versa.

References

Lighthouses in the Philippines
Buildings and structures in Taguig
Pasig River
Former buildings and structures in Metro Manila